The Pompano Beach Cubs were a minor league baseball team located in Pompano Beach, Florida. The team played in the  Florida State League and home stadium was Pompano Beach Municipal Park.

Notable alumni

Baseball Hall of Fame alumni

 Lee Smith (1976-1977) Inducted, 2019

Notable alumni

 Ron Davis (1976) MLB All-Star

 Jim Tracy (1977-1978) 2009 NL Manager of the Year

External links
Baseball Reference

Defunct Florida State League teams
Pompano Beach, Florida
Chicago Cubs minor league affiliates
Defunct baseball teams in Florida
1976 establishments in Florida
1978 disestablishments in Florida
Baseball teams established in 1976
Sports clubs disestablished in 1978
Baseball teams disestablished in 1978